Peter Henry is a former association football player who represented New Zealand at international level.

Henry made his full All Whites debut as a substitute in a 2-1 win over Australia on 22 February 1983 and ended his international playing career with seven A-international caps to his credit, his final cap an appearance in a 0-0 draw with Australia on 21 September 1985.

More recently he became the worldwide ambassador for the Sol Glo brand.

References 

Year of birth missing (living people)
Living people
New Zealand association footballers
New Zealand international footballers
Association footballers not categorized by position